Isaskar Gurirab (born 1 March 1998) is a Namibian professional footballer who plays as a forward for Orapa United fc.

Club career
Born in Uis in the Erongo Region, Gurirab was a fan of Orlando Pirates. After having an unsuccessful trial with the club, he joined Golden Bees FC from Outjo before moving on to Life Fighters. Gurirab was won the MVP and Golden Boot awards for the Namibia Premier League for the 2018–19 season after scoring 22 goals in 24 matches for Life Fighters. His club Life Fighters finished fifth in the league in what was Gurirab's first top-flight season. Following the season, Gurirab went on trial with Difaâ Hassani El Jadidi of the Moroccon Botola. However, it was cut short by injury. The Following year he finally moved to Orlando Pirates for the inaugural season of the Namibia Premier Football League. Gurirab took an early lead in the goal scoring race as he tallied eight goals shortly into the season, including five goals in the first two matches of the season.

International career
Gurirab made his senior international debut on 28 May 2019 in a 2019 COSAFA Cup defeat to Malawi. Two days later he scored his first two senior international goals in a 3–0 victory over the Seychelles.

International goals
Scores and results list Namibia's goal tally first.

International career statistics

Honours

Individual
 Namibia Premier League player of the year: 2018–19
 Namibia Premier League top scorer: 2018–19

References

External links
 
 
 

Living people
1998 births
Namibian men's footballers
Namibia international footballers
2019 Africa Cup of Nations players
Association football forwards
Life Fighters F.C. players
Namibia Premier League players
Footballers from Windhoek